Domenico Petrucci (died 1598) was a Roman Catholic prelate who served as Bishop of Bisignano (1584–1598) and Bishop of Strongoli (1582–1584).

On 17 June 1582, Domenico Petrucci was appointed during the papacy of Pope Gregory XIII as Bishop of Strongoli.
On 17 June 1582, he was consecrated bishop by Giulio Antonio Santorio, Cardinal-Priest of San Bartolomeo all'Isola, with Giovanni Battista Santorio, Bishop of Alife, and Agostino Quinzio, Bishop of Korčula, serving as co-consecrators. On 23 July 1584, he was appointed during the papacy of Pope Gregory XIII as Bishop of Bisignano. He served as Bishop of Bisignano until his death in 1598.

While bishop, he was the principal co-consecrator of Francesco Antonio D'Affitto, Bishop of San Marco (1585).

References

External links and additional sources
 (for Chronology of Bishops) 
 (for Chronology of Bishops)  
 (for Chronology of Bishops) 
 (for Chronology of Bishops) 

16th-century Italian Roman Catholic bishops
Bishops appointed by Pope Gregory XIII
1598 deaths
Inquisitors of Malta